Fullerton First Methodist Episcopal Church (also known as Seventh Day Adventist Church ; Church of Religious Science) is a historic church building at 117 N. Pomona Avenue in Fullerton, California.  By 2000 it was a Centers for Spiritual Living church.

It was built in 1909 in the Late Gothic Revival style.

The church was added to the National Register of Historic Places in 2001 as "Fullerton First Methodist Episcopal Church".

See also
National Register of Historic Places listings in Orange County, California

References

External links

Churches in Orange County, California
Buildings and structures in Fullerton, California
Methodist churches in California
National Register of Historic Places in Orange County, California
Churches on the National Register of Historic Places in California
Churches completed in 1909
Gothic Revival church buildings in California
1909 establishments in California
Tourist attractions in Fullerton, California